Connecticut elected all five of its representatives at-large on a general ticket on September 20, 1790.

There were two subsequent special elections.  The first was held to fill the vacancy left by Pierpont Edwards (Pro-Administration) declining to serve and was won by Jeremiah Wadsworth (Pro-Administration).  The second was held September 19, 1791 to fill the vacancy left by Roger Sherman (Pro-Administration)'s election to the Senate and was won by Amasa Learned (Pro-Administration).

See also 
 United States House of Representatives elections, 1790 and 1791
 List of United States representatives from Connecticut

References 

1790
United States House of Representatives
Connecticut